The 1992 Angus District Council election took place on the 7 May 1992 to elect members of Angus District Council, as part of that year's Scottish local elections.

Aggregate results

Ward Results

References

1992 Scottish local elections
1992